Visual FoxPro is a Microsoft data-centric procedural programming language with object-oriented programming (OOP) features.

It was derived from FoxPro (originally known as FoxBASE) which was developed by Fox Software beginning in 1984. Fox Technologies merged with Microsoft in 1992, after which the software acquired further features and the prefix "Visual". FoxPro 2.6 worked on Mac OS, DOS, Windows, and Unix.

Visual FoxPro 3.0, the first "Visual" version, reduced platform support to only Mac and Windows, and later versions 5, 6, 7, 8 and 9 were Windows-only. The current version of Visual FoxPro is COM-based and Microsoft has stated that they do not intend to create a Microsoft .NET version.

Version 9.0, released in December 2004 and updated in October 2007 with the SP2 patch, was the final version of the product. Support ended on January 2010 and extended support on January 2015.

History

Visual FoxPro originated as a member of the class of languages commonly referred to as "xBase" languages, which have syntax based on the dBase programming language. Other members of the xBase language family include Clipper and Recital (database).

Visual FoxPro, commonly abbreviated as VFP, is tightly integrated with its own relational database engine, which extends FoxPro's xBase capabilities to support SQL query and data manipulation. Unlike most database management systems, Visual FoxPro is a full-featured, dynamic programming language that does not require the use of an additional general-purpose programming environment. It can be used to write not just traditional "fat client" applications, but also middleware and web applications.

In late 2002, it was demonstrated that Visual FoxPro can run on Linux under the Wine Windows compatibility suite. In 2003, this led to complaints by Microsoft: it was claimed that the deployment of runtime FoxPro code on non-Windows machines violates the End User License Agreement.

Visual FoxPro had a rapid rise and fall in popularity as measured by the TIOBE Programming Community Index. In December 2005, VFP broke into the top 20 for the first time. In June 2006 it peaked at position 12, making it (at the time) a "B" language.  As of January 2023, Visual FoxPro holds position 21 on the TIOBE index.

In March 2007, Microsoft announced that there would be no VFP 10, thus making VFP9 (released to manufacturing on December 17, 2004) the last commercial VFP release from Microsoft. Service Pack 2 for Microsoft Visual FoxPro 9.0 was released on October 16, 2007. The support of Version 9 ended on January 13, 2015.

At the time of the end of life announcement, work on the next release codenamed Sedna (named after a recently discovered dwarf planet) which was built on top of the VFP9 codebase had already begun. "Sedna" is a set of add-ons to VFP 9.0 of xBase components to support a number of interoperability scenarios with various Microsoft technologies including SQL Server 2005, .NET Framework, Windows Vista, Office 2007, Windows Search and Team Foundation Server (TFS). Microsoft released Sedna under the Shared source license on the CodePlex site. Microsoft has clarified that the VFP core will still remain closed source. Sedna was released on January 25, 2008. As of March 2008, all xBase components of the VFP 9 SP2 (including Sedna) were available for community-development on CodePlex.

In late March 2007 a grassroots campaign was started by the Spanish-speaking FoxPro community at MásFoxPro ("MoreFoxPro" in English) to sign a petition to Microsoft to continue updating Visual FoxPro or release it to the community as open-source. On April 3, 2007, the movement was noted by the technical press.

On April 3, 2007, Microsoft responded to the petition with this statement from Alan Griver:

"We're very aware of the FoxPro community and that played a large part in what we announced on March 13th. It's never an easy decision to announce that we're not going to release another version of a product and it's one that we consider very carefully.

"We're not announcing the end of FoxPro: Obviously, FoxPro applications will continue to work.  By some of our internal estimates, there are more applications running in FoxPro 2.6 than there are in VFP and FoxPro 2.6 hasn't been supported in many years.  Visual FoxPro 9 will be supported by Microsoft through 2015.

"For Microsoft to continue to evolve the FoxPro base, we would need to look at creating a 64-bit development environment and that would involve an almost complete rewrite of the core product.  We've also invested in creating a scalable database with SQL Server, including the freely available SQL Server Express Edition. As far as forming a partnership with a third-party is concerned, we've heard from a number of large FoxPro customers that this would make it impossible for them to continue to use FoxPro since it would no longer be from an approved vendor. We felt that putting the environment into open source on CodePlex, which balances the needs of both the community and the large customers, was the best path forward."

Version Timeline 
All versions listed are for Windows.

Code samples 
The FoxPro language contains commands quite similar to other programming languages such as Basic.

Some basic syntax samples:
FOR i = 1 to 10
    x = x + 6.5
NEXT  && Instead of "NEXT" can also use "ENDFOR"

IF i = 25
    i = i + 1
ELSE
    i = i + 3
ENDIF

x = 1
DO WHILE x < 50
    x =  x + 1
ENDDO

x = 1
DO WHILE .T.
    x = x + 1
    IF x < 50
        LOOP
    ELSE
        EXIT
    ENDIF
ENDDO

nMonth = MONTH(DATE())
DO CASE
    CASE nMonth <= 3
        MESSAGEBOX("Q1")

    CASE nMonth <= 6
        MESSAGEBOX("Q2")

    CASE nMonth <= 9
        MESSAGEBOX("Q3")

    OTHERWISE
        MESSAGEBOX("Q4")
ENDCASE

FOR EACH oControl IN THISFORM.Controls
    MESSAGEBOX(oControl.Name)
ENDFOR

f = Factorial(10)

FUNCTION Factorial(n)
LOCAL i, r

    r = 1
    FOR i = n TO 1 STEP -1
        r = r * i
    NEXT  && Can also use "ENDFOR" here instead of "NEXT"
    RETURN r
ENDFUNC

Hello World examples:
 * Output at the current location
 ? "Hello World"

 * Output at a specified location
 @ 1,1 SAY "Hello World"

 * Output in a separate window, cleared on input
 WAIT WINDOW "Hello World"

 * Output in a standard dialog box, cleared on OK
 MESSAGEBOX("Hello World")

Object 

* Output in a defined window
loForm = CREATEOBJECT("HiForm")
loForm.Show(1)

DEFINE CLASS HiForm AS Form
    AutoCenter   = .T.
    Caption      = "Hello, World"

    ADD OBJECT lblHi as Label ;
        WITH Caption = "Hello, World!"
ENDDEFINE

loMine = CREATEOBJECT("MyClass")
? loMine.cProp1               && This will work. (Double-ampersand marks an end-of-line comment)
? loMine.cProp2               && Program Error: Property CPROP2 is not found because it's hidden externally.

? loMine.MyMethod1()          && This will work.
? loMine.MyMethod2()          && Program Error: Property MYMETHOD2 is not found because it's hidden externally.

DEFINE CLASS MyClass AS Custom
    cProp1 = "My Property"    && This is a public property
    HIDDEN cProp2             && This is a private (hidden) property
    dProp3 = {}               && Another public property

    PROCEDURE Init()          && Class constructor
        This.cProp2 = "This is a hidden property."

    PROCEDURE dProp3_Access   && Property Getter
        RETURN DATE()

    PROCEDURE dProp3_Assign(vNewVal)     && Property Setter uses the "_assign" tag on the property name
        IF VARTYPE(vNewVal) = "D"
            THIS.dProp3 = vNewVal
        ENDIF

    PROCEDURE MyMethod1()
    * This is a public method, calling a hidden method that returns
    * the value of a hidden property.
        RETURN This.MyMethod2()

    HIDDEN PROCEDURE MyMethod2()  && This is a private (hidden) method
        RETURN This.cProp2
ENDDEFINE

 VFP has an extensive library of predefined classes and visual objects which are accessed in the IDE by a Property Sheet (including Methods), so code such as the above defining classes and objects are only needed for special purposes and the framework of large systems.

Data handling 
The language also has extensive database manipulation and indexing commands.
The "help" index of commands in VFP 9 has several hundred commands and functions described. 
The examples below show how to code the creation and indexing of tables, however VFP has table and database builder screens which create the tables and indexes without making you write code.

 * Create a table
 CREATE TABLE randData (iData I)

 * Populate with random data using xBase and SQL DML commands
 FOR i = 1 TO 50
     APPEND BLANK
     REPLACE iData WITH (RAND() * 100)

     INSERT INTO randData (iData) VALUES (RAND() * 100)
 ENDFOR

 * Place a structural index on the data
 INDEX ON iData TAG iData
 CLOSE DATA       && Do not close open libraries etc

 * Display ordered data using xBase-style commands
 USE randData
 SET ORDER TO iData
 LOCATE           && In place of GO TOP. Enforces use of index to find TOP  
 LIST NEXT 10     && First 10
 GO BOTTOM
 SKIP -10
 LIST REST        && Last 10
 CLOSE DATA

 * Browse ordered data using SQL DML commands
 SELECT * ;
   FROM randData ;
   ORDER BY iData DESCENDING

ODBC access using SQL passthrough 
 PRIVATE cAuthorID, cAuthorName      && Private variables supplant any previous global or private variable of the same name
 LOCAL nHnd, nResult                 && Local variables are visible only here

 * Connect to an ODBC data source
 nHnd = SQLCONNECT ("ODBCDSN", "user", "pwd")

 * Enter a loop so we can exit to the close connection code if there's an error
 DO WHILE .T.
     * Execute a SQL command
     nResult = SQLEXEC (nHnd, "USE master")
     IF nResult < 0
         MESSAGEBOX ("MASTER database does not exist!")
         EXIT  && To close the connection
     ENDIF

     * Retrieve data from the remote server and stores it in a local data cursor
     nResult = SQLEXEC (nHnd, "SELECT * FROM authors", "QAUTHORS")
     IF nResult < 0
         MESSAGEBOX ("Unable to execute remote SQL SELECT command!")
         EXIT  && To close the connection
     ENDIF

     * Update a record in a remote table using parameters
     cAuthorID     = "1001"
     cAuthorName   = "New name"
     nResult       = SQLEXEC (nHnd, "UPDATE authors SET auth_name = ?cAuthorName WHERE auth_id = ?cAuthorID")
     IF nResult < 0
         MESSAGEBOX ("Unable to execute remote SQL UPDATE command!")
         EXIT  && To close the connection
     ENDIF

     * If we get here, we have retrieved everything successfully
     EXIT  && Exit unconditionally
 ENDDO

 * Close the connection
 SQLDISCONNECT(nHnd)

See also 
 Visual Objects
 Xbase++
 Harbour
XSharp

References

External links

Microsoft pages
 Main Visual FoxPro Microsoft page
 MSDN FoxPro support board
 VFP's online help

Other pages
 A site devoted to the history of FoxPro
 VFPx A Visual FoxPro Community effort to create open source add-ons for VFP 9.0
 Fox In Cloud online clone homepage

Programming languages
Fourth-generation programming languages
Data-centric programming languages
Object-oriented programming languages
XBase programming language family
Procedural programming languages
Desktop database application development tools
Microsoft development tools
Microsoft database software
Microsoft programming languages
Programming languages created in 1984
Discontinued Microsoft development tools
High-level programming languages
1984 software
Multi-paradigm programming languages
Discontinued Microsoft software